Spiral Galaxy is an outdoor stainless steel sculpture by John David Mooney, installed outside the Adler Planetarium on Chicago's Northerly Island, in the U.S. state of Illinois.

Description and history
The work was commissioned by the Vatican Observatory in 1994 to commemorate the Inspiration of Astronomical Phenomena conference, and inspired by Galileo's drawings and early photographs of the closest galaxies to Earth. The  sculpture was installed at Navy Pier in 1998, then temporarily exhibited in Sarasota, Florida. Spiral Galaxy was moved to its current location in 2005, to commemorate the planetarium's 75th anniversary.

See also
 1998 in art
 List of public art in Chicago

References

1998 establishments in Illinois
1998 sculptures
Outdoor sculptures in Chicago
Stainless steel sculptures in the United States
Steel sculptures in Illinois